Barbara Anne Hogan (born 28 February 1952) is a former Minister of Health and of Public Enterprises in the Cabinet of South Africa.

Early life
Hogan attended St Dominic's Catholic School for Girls, Boksburg, and gained a degree at the University of the Witwatersrand. Hogan has qualifications in Accounting and Economics.

Political activity
Hogan joined the African National Congress in 1976 after the Soweto Uprising, many years after the organisation had been declared illegal and had moved its activities underground. Her responsibilities in this movement were to mobilise the white political left, participate in public political campaigning and supply the ANC underground in Botswana with information about trade union and community activity in South Africa. Hogan was detained in 1982 for ‘furthering the aims of a banned organisation’ and after being interrogated, ill-treated and held in solitary confinement for one year, she became the first woman in South Africa found guilty of high treason and was sentenced to ten years in prison.

Hogan was released in 1990 with the unbanning of outlawed organisations and together with other political prisoners, most notably Nelson Mandela. Upon release she played a pivotal role in restructuring the ANC in her capacity as secretary of the PWV regional office.

Career
When Kgalema Motlanthe took office as President on 25 September 2008, he appointed Hogan as Minister of Health to replace Manto Tshabalala-Msimang. Hogan was named Minister of Public Health in September 2008 on the basis of her financial managerial skills, which were urgently needed in the rundown Department of Health, according to her in a 2008 interview by News24. Although Hogan was not a medical professional, she said that she had a very capable deputy, Dr Molefi Sefularo, who was a medical doctor and had been very engaged in the healthcare sector.  Hogan helped the South African government address the AIDS pandemic among South Africans after almost a decade of denial and neglect by the previous Minister of Health, Manto Tshabalala-Msimang.

Hogan is a member of the advisory board of the Amandla AIDS Fund (AAF), which was established by the nonprofit organisation Artists for a New South Africa (ANSA) in 2003 with a $2.5 million donation from Carlos and Deborah Santana, which represented the entire net proceeds of the 2003 U.S. Summer Santana Shaman tour. AAF provides grants to effective South African efforts to combat AIDS and also develops innovative, collaborative programmes. Amandla means "strength" or "power" in Zulu, Xhosa and other South African languages. The AAF advisory board, chaired by Archbishop Desmond Tutu, includes leading South African HIV/AIDS experts and AIDS activists who help select effective South African organisations and programmes to receive grants. In the past year, AAF has allocated and granted over $1.25 million to HIV/AIDS advocacy, prevention and treatment programmes. ANSA also works to further civil rights and safeguard voting rights in the U.S.

In May 2009, she was appointed to the Ministry of Public Enterprises, from which she was axed in 2010 by President Jacob Zuma. In December 2015 she denounced the president for sacking the then finance minister (Nhlanhla Nene) and called on the citizenry to "rise up and say enough is enough."

Zondo Commission Inquiry into state capture 
In 2018, Hogan testified before The Judicial Commission of Inquiry into Allegations of State Capture, stating that former president Jacob Zuma had pressured her into appointing Siyabonga Gama as Transnet CEO, "despite him facing allegations of misconduct."

Honours
Hogan was included in the 2009 Time 100, an annual list of the 100 most influential people in the world.

On April 13, 2011, Hogan received an honorary doctoral degree from the University of Kentucky, alongside her life-partner Ahmed Kathrada.

Personal life
Barbara Hogan met Ahmed Kathrada after her release from prison in 1990.

References

External links
The South African History Archive: Barbara Hogan
ANSA Website

1952 births
Living people
Health ministers of South Africa
South African prisoners and detainees
Prisoners and detainees of South Africa
People convicted of treason
Members of the National Assembly of South Africa
African National Congress politicians
University of the Witwatersrand alumni
South African people of Irish descent
White South African anti-apartheid activists
Women government ministers of South Africa
Women members of the National Assembly of South Africa
20th-century South African women politicians